Ruddell This Christian surname is of French and English Origin may refer to:

Cec Ruddell (1917–1990), Australian rules footballer
David Frederick Ruddell Wilson (1871–1957), Irish Anglican priest and hymnist
Gary Ruddell (born 1951), American artist known for cover paintings for works of science fiction and fantasy literature
George Ruddell Black (1865–1942), unionist politician in Northern Ireland
Isaac Ruddell (1737–1812), 18th-century American Virginia State Line officer during the American Revolutionary War

See also
Ruddell, Saskatchewan, village in the Canadian province of Saskatchewan
Ruddell General Store, historic general store building located at Glenville, Gilmer County, West Virginia